The House of Durnovo (known variant 'Durnovy' [plural], 'Durnov'[m] ,'Durnova' [f]) is a prominent family of Russian nobility. Durnovo is one of two Russian noble families, of which the most famous is the branch of the Tolstoy.

In the mid 15th century The Velvet Book lists founder Mikula F. Durnovo grandson of Vasily Yurevich Tolstoy, nicknamed as Durnoy [Could be translated as: A Fool, Spoiled, Bad, Joker]) as a founder of the family. His brothers Daniel and Basil founded families of Danilov and Vasilchikov. 
Durnovo listed in the sixth part of the Sovereign's Pedigree Book of Vologda, Kaluga, Kostroma, Moscow, Orёl, and St. Petersburg, Tambov, Tula and Tver provinces.

Coat of arms
Durnovo's coat of arms is practically identical with the "parent" coat of arms of Tolstoy family

Notable Family Members

Nikolay Dmitriyevich Durnovo (1725–1816) – General of Infantry
Dmitry Nikolayevich Durnovo (1769–1834) – Russian politician
Maria Nikitichna Durnovo (Demidova) (1776–1847) – wife of Dmitry Nikolaevich Durnovo
Alexey Mikhailovich Durnovo (1792–1849) – Count, Tula Oblast
Pavel Dmitrievich Durnovo (1804–1864) – Politician and courtier
Ivan Nikolayevich Durnovo (1834–1903) – Politician, Prime minister of Russia (1895–1903)
Pyotr Pavlovich Durnovo (1835–1919) – General Governor of Moscow Military District 
Pyotr Nikolayevich Durnovo (1845–1915) – Minister of Interior of Russia
Yelizaveta Petrovna Durnovo(1855–1910) – Member of Narodniki movement
Nikolay Nikolayevich Durnovo (1876–1937) – Linguist

Partial Family Tree
Known family members in Chart Template format

Known Architectural Legacy and Geographical Location

Dacha Durnovo
Church of The Transfiguration (Village of Spasskaya-Durnovo)
See File:Moscow, Podkolokolny 16-5, medical school.jpg (Moscow Medical College #2)
Abashevo, Penza Oblast

Other Family Connections
Alexander Griboyedov – Maria Sergeyevna Durnovo (Griboyedova) sister of A.S. Griboyedov married to Alexey Mikhailovich Durnovo

Notes and references

 
Russian noble families
Diplomats of the Russian Empire
19th-century dramatists and playwrights from the Russian Empire
Russian dramatists and playwrights
Tolstoy family
Russian male dramatists and playwrights
19th-century male writers